Cycloponympha is a genus of moths belonging to the family Tineidae. or Lyonetiidae.

Species
Cycloponympha hermione Meyrick, 1921
Cycloponympha julia Meyrick, 1913
Cycloponympha perspicua Meyrick, 1913

References

Lyonetiidae
Moth genera